Periș is a commune in Ilfov County, Romania.

Peris may also refer to:

Places
 Periş, a village in Gornești Commune, Mureș County, Romania
 Periş, a former village in Independenţa Commune, Constanţa County, Romania
 Periš, a village in Serbia

People
 Nova Peris (born 1971), Australian hockey player, runner and politician
 Mercedes Peris (born 1985), Spanish Olympic swimmer
 Saint Peris, Welsh saint
 Jovaldir Ferreira (known as Peris; born 1982), Brazilian footballer
 Giancarlo Peris (born 1941), Italian track athlete
 Don Peris and Karen Peris, band members of The Innocence Mission

Other uses
 Peris FC, a sports club in Duhok, Iraq

See also
 Perris
 Peri (disambiguation)